Həsənqala or Gasankala may refer to:
Həsənqala, Khachmaz, Azerbaijan
Həsənqala, Qusar, Azerbaijan

See also
Həsənqaya (disambiguation)